Taungoo University or the University of Taungoo is a public liberal arts university, located nearNyaunggine Village in Taungoo, Bago Division, Myanmar. The university mainly offers Bachelor's and master's degree programs in liberal arts and sciences, and law, mostly to students from the Taungoo District and its vicinity.

Programs
Classified as an Arts and Science university in the Burmese university education system, Taungoo University offers bachelor's and master's degree programs in common liberal arts and sciences disciplines. Its regular Bachelor of Arts (BA) and Bachelor of Science (BSc) degrees take four years to complete and honors degree programs BA (Hons) and BSc (Hons) take five years. The law program also takes five years. The master's degree programs take two years.

Departments
Department of Mathematics 
Department of Physics 
Department of Chemistry 
Department of Zoology 
Department of Botany 
Department of Law 
Department of English 
Department of Burmese 
Department of History 
Department of Philosophy
Department of Psychology
Department of Geology 
Department of Oriental Studies 
Department of Geography

Campus
Arts Building 
Convocation Hall 
Recreation Centre 
Science Building 
Health Center

References

Universities and colleges in Taungoo
Universities and colleges in Bago Region
Arts and Science universities in Myanmar
Universities and colleges in Myanmar